Caladenia fluvialis, commonly known as the Brookton Highway spider orchid is a species of orchid endemic to the south-west of Western Australia. It is a recently discovered orchid with a single hairy leaf and one or two cream-yellow flowers with red markings on the labellum.

Description
Caladenia fluvialis is a terrestrial, perennial, deciduous, herb with an underground tuber and which sometimes forms clumps. The lateral sepals and petals have dark tips. The sides of the labellum have short, blunt teeth, decreasing in size towards the front, its tip is curved downwards and there are two rows of anvil-shaped calli along its centre. Flowering occurs from August to September.

Taxonomy and naming
Caladenia fluvialis was first described in 2015 by Andrew Phillip Brown and Garry Brockman from a specimen collected near West Dale and the description was published in Nuytsia. The specific epithet (fluvialis) is a Latin word meaning "of a river" referring to the habitat preference of this species.

Distribution and habitat
This caladenia occurs between Williams and York in the Avon Wheatbelt, and Jarrah Forest biogeographic regions where it grows in moist soils in ephemeral creeks and near granite outcrops.

Conservation
Caladenia fluvialis is classified as "not threatened" by the Government of Western Australia Department of Parks and Wildlife.

References

fluvialis
Orchids of Western Australia
Endemic orchids of Australia
Plants described in 2015
Endemic flora of Western Australia